Cathy Marie Buchanan is a Canadian novelist.

Early life and education
Buchanan was born and raised in Niagara Falls, Ontario. She holds a BSc (Honours Biochemistry) and an MBA from Western University and became a certified yoga instructor in 2019.

Career
The Day the Falls Stood Still, Buchanan's debut novel, was published in 2009. Inspired by the life of Niagara riverman, William "Red" Hill, the novel chronicles early hydroelectric development on the Niagara River. The novel was chosen as a Barnes & Noble Recommends selection, a Barnes & Noble Best of 2009 book, an American Booksellers Association IndieNext pick and a CBC Canada Reads Top 40 Essential Canadian Novel of the Decade.  

The Painted Girls, her second novel, was published in 2013. The Painted Girls is set in belle époque Paris and was inspired by the real-life model, Marie van Goethem, for Edgar Degas's c. 1880 statue Little Dancer of Fourteen Years and a notorious criminal trial of the era. 

Buchanan's forthcoming novel, Daughter of Black Lake (October 2020), is set in Iron Age Britain on the eve of Roman conquest and tells the story of Smith, Devout and their daughter Hobble, who has the gift of prophesy and walks with a limp. With old customs dictating human sacrifice in times of great stress, anxiety mounts as the Romans draw closer to the family's remote settlement.

References

External links 
 Official website

21st-century Canadian novelists
Canadian women novelists
Living people
People from Niagara Falls, Ontario
21st-century Canadian women writers
Writers from Ontario
Year of birth missing (living people)